Teodoro Cano Garcia (born 1932) is an artist from Papantla, Veracruz, Mexico who is best known for his mural work depicting the Totonac culture of his native region in northern Veracruz. Cano was discovered by Diego Rivera, who helped Cano as a youth enter the prestigious San Carlos Academy and then employed him as an assistant with the mural work being done at the Ciudad Universitaria in Mexico City. Cano painted his first solo mural in 1953, and since then has produced paintings, murals, sculptures, photography, book illustrations and more, including creating a high relief technique with a cement base. However, Cano is best known for his mural work which depicts and promotes the Totonac culture, and much of his work can be seen in his hometown, including a monumental sculpture of a Volador dancer overlooking the city. Cano also worked as an academic for over 36 years, recently retiring, but he continues to work as an artist based in Xalapa.

Preparation
Cano was born in the small city of Papantla, Veracruz in 1932, and began drawing at a young age. When Diego Rivera was in Papantla in 1945, Cano had a chance to meet the famous painter and show him some of his work. Impressed, Rivera had the 14-year-old Cano come to Mexico City and work at his home as a personal assistant. However, this only lasted four months until Rivera decided that the young man needed formal training. He contacted then-governor of Veracruz Adolfo Ruiz Cortines to get a scholarship for Cano at the prestigious San Carlos Academy. Cano attended the institution from 1947 to 1951 and graduated with honors.

After graduation, he went back to work with Diego Rivera and José Chávez Morado, who were working on murals at the recently constructed Ciudad Universitaria. Cano worked assisting both between 1949 and 1950. He mostly assisted with the works located on the Olympic stadium, the main library and the Faculty of Sciences buildings.

Career
In 1953, he painted his first solo mural at radio station XEPR, called "Historia del Petróleo" (History of Petroleum). Soon after, he painted "Papantla y sus Educadores" at a primary school in his hometown. During the rest of the 1950s, he painted murals in various parts of Veracruz including "Historia de Tuxpan y Homenaje al Maestro" in Tuxpan, "Servicio Social" in Poza Rica, "Pérgola" in Coatzintla, "Papantla" in the same city and "Royal" in Poza Rica. In the 1960s, he mostly did canvas work with expositions in the north of Veracruz. He painted one mural called "Historia de Mexico" in Poza Rica. His most prolific period was the 1970s, painting and sculpting numerous works in Veracruz, and as a teacher supervised many more works done by students as part of a muralist movement in rural areas of Veracruz, Campeche, Yucatán, Tamaulipas, Coahuila, Sinaloa and Colima .

In 1985, he created his most important work called "Historia de la Educación Federal at the Xalapa delegation of the Secretariat of Public Education.  Also during the 1980s, he sculpted a number of works including a monument to the Niños Héroes in Coyutla and the monumental sculpture of a Volador dancer in Papantla. The 1990s were mostly devoted to mural work including "Historia de la Medicina" in Xalapa, "La Justicia" in Xalapa and "Mis Raices in the Metro Bellas Artes in Mexico City. In the 2000s, he created works in various media including murals, sculpted murals and sculptures. During his entire career, he has had numerous showing of his non-mural/monumental works in the states of Veracruz, Aguascalientes, Mexico City and abroad in San Francisco and Japan .

Book illustrations include "Cuentos para ser contados" in 1985, "ECCE PEUR" in 1986, "Cantares Huastecos y otros Ensayos" in 1991, "Brisas Huastecas" in 1996 and "Memoria del Totonacapan" in 1999.

Cano has worked in painting, sculpting, etching, drawing, book illustrations and photography, but he is best known for his mural work, especially for work related to and promoting his native Totonac culture.(rincones15) . He is the creator of a high relief mural technique which used reinforced concrete as its base. While Cano's work can be found in both Mexico and abroad, most of Cano's work are found in Veracruz state, with over sixty murals alone in the state, and in Mexico City. (rincones15) His work can be found in many places in his native Papantla, from the monumental sculpture of a Volador atop a mountain overlooking the city to large murals such as  "Homenaje a la Cultura Totonaca," which describes the history of Papantla from the pre-Hispanic era to the present day. It was created by Cano along with sculptors Rivera Diaz, Contreras Garcia and Vidal Espejel in 1979, measuring 84 meters long and four meters wide. In an interview in 2007, Cano stated that he considers his work to be instructive, meant for those with little knowledge of the arts, focusing on happy elements such as dance. This is in contrast with much of modern art, he says, which can turn off many who see it for the first time.

In addition to his artistic career, Cano has had an academic career, mostly associated with the Universidad Veracruzana (UV) in Poza Rica. In 1960, he founded the Escuela de Pintura in conjunction with the Secretariat of Public Education in Poza Rica. He cofounded and directed the Escuela de Artesanias (Schools of Handcrafts and Folk Art) in Coatepec .  In 1969, he began with UV and would retire from the institution 36 years later. He began as the director of the Taller Libre de Arte in Poza Rica, and ten years later, he founded the Talleres Libres de Arte de Papantla, associated with UV.  This latter institution has trained hundreds of young artists in various specialties. In 1988, he became the director of the Casa de Cultura (Cultural Center) of Papantla, a position he currently maintains.

Since graduating from the San Carlos Academy, Cano has received numerous awards for his artistic and academic work. The most recent include, one from a business group in Poza Rica in 2005, one from a petroleum workers union and one from the Universidad Veracruzana in 2006 and the "Adolfo Ruiz Cortinez" Medal awarded by the Veracruz state government in 2007.   He is also one of few artists in Mexico to have had a museum dedicated to his works while still alive.

While retired from academia, Cano continues his artistic career based in Xalapa, Veracruz. In 2010, he exhibited a photographic collection along with conferences about vanilla, a flower and seed pod native to Papantla which has given it the nickname of "La Ciudad que Perfuma al Mundo" (The City that Perfumes the World) .

References

1932 births
Mexican muralists
Academic staff of Universidad Veracruzana
Living people
Artists from Veracruz